The 2002 Road America 500 presented by the Chicago Tribune was the fourth round of the 2002 American Le Mans Series season.  It took place at Road America, Wisconsin, on July 7, 2002.

Official results
Class winners in bold.

† - #31 Petersen Motorsports was disqualified during the race for receiving outside assistance while still on the track.

Statistics
 Pole Position - #2 Audi Sport North America - 1:52.166
 Fastest Lap - #1 Audi Sport North America - 1:53.403
 Distance - 759.610 km
 Average Speed - 178.710 km/h

External links
 
 World Sports Racing Prototypes - Race Results

Road America
Road America 500
Road America
Road America 500